Mirificarma interrupta is a moth of the family Gelechiidae. It is found in Portugal, Spain, France, the Benelux, central Europe, Romania and North Africa.

The wingspan is 7-8.5 mm for males and females. The head is white to cream. The forewings are cream tinged with pale yellow, with scattered brown scales. Adults are on wing from March to July in one generation per year.

The larvae feed on Cytisus scoparius, Cytisus purgans, Genista species (records include Genista tinctoria, Genista pilosa, Genista germanica and Genista sagittalis). They probably live in the flowers although it has also been recorded under leaves spun to the twig.

References

Moths described in 1827
Mirificarma
Moths of Europe
Moths of Africa